Henry Greyson Shue (born March 24, 1940) is an American philosopher and Professor Emeritus of Politics and International Relations at Merton College of Oxford University. Previously he was Wyn and William Y Hutchinson Professor of Ethics & Public Life at Cornell University. Shue is best known for his book, Basic Rights: Subsistence, Affluence, and U.S. Foreign Policy.

Books
 Basic Rights (Princeton 1980; 2nd edition, 1996) 
 Climate Justice: Vulnerability and Protection
 Fighting Hurt: Rule and Exception in Torture and War

Edited Books
 Preemption: Military Action and Moral Justification, co-edited with David Rodin, Oxford University Press, 2010, 
 Nuclear Deterrence and Moral Restraint: Critical Choices for American Strategy (Cambridge Studies in Philosophy and Public Policy)
 Climate Ethics: Essential Readings
 The American Way of Bombing: Changing Ethical and Legal Norms, from Flying Fortresses to Drones
 Just and Unjust Warriors: The Moral and Legal Status of Soldiers
 Climate Justice: Integrating Economics and Philosophy
 The Border That Joins: Mexican Migrants & U. S. Responsibility (Maryland Studies in Public Philosophy)
 ''Pivotal generation :  Why we have a moral responsibility to slow climate change right now.  Oxford University Press, 2021. 

See also
Preventive war
Preemptive war
distributive justice 
international normative theory

References

External links
Henry Shue at Oxford

American philosophers
Analytic philosophers
Political philosophers
Philosophy academics
Living people
1940 births
Cornell University faculty
Fellows of Merton College, Oxford
American expatriates in the United Kingdom
Alumni of Merton College, Oxford